Kiamika can refer to the following places, all in Quebec, Canada:
 Kiamika, Quebec, municipality
 Kiamika River
 Kiamika Reservoir
 Kiamika Reservoir Regional Park